Cladophora is a genus of reticulated filamentous Ulvophyceae (green algae). The genus Cladophora contains many species that are very hard to tell apart and classify, mainly because of the great variation in their appearances, which is affected by habitat, age and environmental conditions. Unlike Spirogyra the filaments of Cladophora branch and do not undergo conjugation. There are two multicellular stages in its life cycle – a haploid gametophyte and a diploid sporophyte – which look highly similar. The only way to tell the two stages apart is to either count their chromosomes, or examine their offspring. The haploid gametophyte produces haploid gametes by mitosis and the diploid sporophyte produces haploid spores by meiosis. The only visible difference between the gametes and spores of Cladophora is that the gametes have two flagella and the spores have four. The Cladophora species can be a major nuisance causing major alteration to benthic conditions linked particularly with increased phosphorus loading.

Cladophora balls
Cladophora balls are formed from the filaments of the alga which are photosynthetic. Large numbers of these balls were thrown ashore in Devon, England. They had an average diameter of 2.5 cm and several million balls were found forming a layer.

This is not to be confused with marimo, which, though formerly part of Cladophora, is now called Aegagropila linnaei.

Laotian Mekong weed

In Laos, Cladophora spp. (ໄຄ  "river weed" or more precisely ໄຄຫີນ  "rock river weed") are commonly eaten as a delicacy and usually known in English under the name "Mekong weed". The algae grow on underwater rocks and thrive in clear spots of water in the Mekong river basin. They are harvested 1 to 5 months a year and most often eaten in dry sheets (ໄຄແຜ່ນ  kaipen -kháy sheets-), similar to Crispy Chinese Seaweed or Japanese nori, though much cruder in their format. Luang Prabang's speciality is dry khai with sesame (kaipen), while Vang Vieng is famous for its roasted kháy sheets. They can be eaten in strips as an appetizer, with a meal or as a snack with Beer Lao. Luang Prabang kháy sheets kaipen are the most readily available form of Mekong weed and are famous throughout the country and in the neighbouring Isaan, though difficult to find beyond Vientiane. Mekong weed can also be eaten raw, in soups, or cooked in steamed curries.

Cladophora as an asset and a nuisance 
The genus Cladophora is cosmopolitan and accordingly infestations cannot often be regarded logically as being invasive. Where they occur they may at various times be seen as beneficial, as a nuisance, or an outright pest.

Modest growth of Cladophora is generally harmless; the growth is an important food for many fish and other aquatic animals, as a buffer for the sequestration of nutrients in the water body and for protection of some aquatic organisms from solar ultraviolet radiation.

Where Cladophora becomes a pest is generally where special circumstances cause such drastic overgrowth that algal blooms develop and form floating mats. Typical examples include where hypertrophication or high mortality of rival organisms produce high concentrations of dissolved phosphorus. Extensive floating mats prevent circulation that is necessary for the aeration of deeper water and, by blocking the light, they kill photosynthesising organisms growing beneath. The mats interfere with the fishing industry by clogging nets and preventing the use of lines. Where they wash ashore the masses of rotting material reduce shoreline property values along water bodies such as the Great Lakes in the United States.

Quagga mussel populations have increased tremendously during the same time frame as the blooming of Cladophora, though their ecological relationships are not yet clear and may be complex.

Diversity
Species include:
Cladophora albida
Cladophora aokii
Cladophora brasiliana
Cladophora catenata
Cladophora coelothrix
Cladophora columbiana
Cladophora crispata
Cladophora dalmatica
Cladophora fracta
Cladophora glomerata
Cladophora graminea
Cladophora montagneana
Cladophora ordinata
Cladophora prolifera
Cladophora rivularis
Cladophora rupestris
Cladophora scopaeformis
Cladophora sericea
Cladophora socialis
Cladophora vagabunda

Aegagropila linnaei (marimo) was formerly placed here as Cladophora aegagropila

References

Cladophora Index. Monterey Bay Aquarium
Marsin, P. and J. Tomasz. (2005). Introductory studies on the morphology of the genus Cladophora from the Gulf of Gdańsk. Ocean. Hydrob. Studies, 34(Supl.3): 187-193

External links
Images of Cladophora at AlgaeBase

Cladophoraceae
Cladophorales genera
Taxa named by Friedrich Traugott Kützing